Rochelle Perts (born 20 March 1992), better known by her stage name Rochelle, is a Surinamese-Dutch singer who rose to prominence after winning the fourth season of talent show X Factor on 10 June 2011.

Discography

Studio albums

EPs

Singles

As lead artist

As featured artist

Notes

References

External links 
 Official website

1992 births
Living people
Dutch people of Surinamese descent
The X Factor winners
People from Helmond
21st-century Dutch singers
21st-century Dutch women singers